Susan Catherine Moore Waters (May 18, 1823 – July 7, 1900) was an American painter. Her early career in New York state and Pennsylvania focused on portraits. After moving to Bordentown, New Jersey, she specialized in paintings of animals as well as an occasional still life and other subjects.

Early years 

Waters was born in Binghamton, New York, the daughter of Lark Moore (a cooper) and his wife, Sally. A self-taught artist with little formal training, she attended Friendsville Boarding School in Friendsville, Pennsylvania, where she paid tuition for her sister and herself by "painting copies for the course in Natural History".

Personal life 
On June 27, 1841, at age 17, she married William C. Waters, whose Quaker connections determined the destinations of their frequent relocations. William, who had health problems, was unable to contribute to provide sufficient income for both of them, which left Susan in the position of provider.

Waters was the primary income earner for herself and her husband. She was involved with the women's suffrage movement and animal rights activism.

Career 
Waters' career as an artist began with commissioned portraits and lessons. Soliciting sitters as she moved between New York and Pennsylvania, Waters employed her talents to support herself and her husband. Instead of canvas, Waters used materials that were readily available to her, primarily mattress ticking, cotton, and linen.

Waters and her husband became active in early forms of photography, taking Daguerreotypes and Ambrotypes.

Waters’ early paintings were enough to ensure herself and her husband some financial security, but she was interested in expanding her range of subject matter, as she indicated in an 1851 letter. As financial security allowed her to move away from contracted portraits, she had more freedom to experiment and explore other forms of expression.

In 1866, the Waters moved to Bordentown, New Jersey, after years of temporary residences. There Waters created some of her best-known paintings of domesticated animals in pastoral settings—especially sheep, which she had in her own yard. The works she produced in Bordentown brought recognition in her lifetime. In 1876, Waters was invited to show some of her paintings at the Centennial Exposition in Philadelphia. In 1899 Waters left Bordentown for a nursing home in Trenton, NJ, where she died the following year.

Collections 
Addison Gallery of American Art, MA
Arnot Art Museum, NY
The Burlington County Historical Society, NJ
Crystal Bridges Museum of American Art, AR
Fenimore Art Museum, NY
Maier Museum of Art at Randolph-Macon Woman's College, VA
Museum of Fine Arts, Boston, MA
National Gallery of Art, Washington D.C.
New Jersey State Museum, NJ
The Newark Museum, NJ
Smithsonian Institution Art Inventories
The Roberson Museum, Binghamton, NY

Exhibitions 
1876	Centennial Exhibition, PA
1979	Bedford Gallery, VA
1980	Arnot Art Museum, NY

Notes

References

Sources 
Bice, Arlene S. Bordentown. Portsmouth, NH: Arcadia Publishing, 2002. p. 61.
Heslip, Colleen C. “Susan C. Waters.” The Magazine Antiques. vol. 115 (1979): 769–777.
Gerdts, William H. Painting and Sculpture in New Jersey. Princeton, NJ: 1964. pp. 109–112.
Strass, Stephanie. “Susan Waters.” American Women Artists, 1819–1947. The Neville Strass Collection, 2003.
Waters, Susan C. and Paul D. Schweizer. “A Letter by Susan Waters Provides New Information on Her Career.” American Art Journal. Vol. 19, No. 1 (1987): 76–77.

1900 deaths
1823 births
Painters from New Jersey
People from Bordentown, New Jersey
American women painters
Artists from Binghamton, New York
Painters from New York (state)
19th-century American painters
19th-century American women artists